The Fatima Buen Story is a 1994 Philippine biographical crime drama film directed by Mario O'Hara. The film stars Kris Aquino as the title role. The film is based on the actual case of Fatima Buen, a complex woman jailed for illegal recruitment.

The film is streaming online on YouTube.

Cast
 Kris Aquino as Fatima Buen
 Charlotte Lugo as Young Fatima
 Zoren Legaspi as Oscar Kintanar
 John Regala as Leslie Baron
 Janice de Belen as Batman
 Gina Pareño as Frank
 Perla Bautista as Corazon
 Leni Santos as Irene
 Shintaro Valdez as Date of Fatima
 Bob Soler as Mr. Dalo Periquet
 Naty Mallares as Lolal Felisa
 Noni Mauricio as Jake
 Carmen Enriquez as Aling Caring
 Dante Balois as Informer
 Brando Legaspi as Date of Fatima
 Josie Galvez as Comadrona
 Nonong de Andres as The Omen
 William Thayer as Mayor
 Judy Teodoro as Recruiter of Japayuki
 Gil Arceo as Warden
 Frank Rivera as Lawyer 
 Enrico Salcedo as Lawyer 
 Ruben O'Hara as Judge
 Yolly Palma as Asuncion
 Bennette Ignacio as Noel
 John Lester Hogan as Youngest son of Fatima
 Oscar Ramirez as Informer
 Alex Cunanan as Yakuza

Awards

References

External links

Full Movie on Regal Entertainment

1994 films
Filipino-language films
Philippine biographical films
Philippine crime films
Regal Entertainment films
1990s biographical films
1994 crime films
Films directed by Mario O'Hara